The Flood: Who Will Save Our Children? is a 1993 American television film, starring Joe Spano, David Lascher and Michael A. Goorjian. It was directed by Chris Thomson and written by Donna Kanter and David J. Kinghorn. The movie is based on a real event that occurred on July 17, 1987. In that day 43 people were taken by a flash flood in the Guadalupe River near the city of Comfort. It was the worst flood of the Guadalupe River since 1932. Ten people died, including a teenager who fell from a helicopter while being rescued as the rope broke. Of the ten fatalities, one body was never found.

Plot
In the city of Comfort, Texas, a Baptist community organizes a summer camp with young people from all over the USA. On the way back from the camp, the convoy of vehicles carrying the participants is surprised by a Flash flood when crossing the river Guadalupe, near the city of San Antonio. A bus and a van are stranded in the middle of the river and the young passengers are forced to hurry out of these two vehicles, and are swept away by the current. In the midst of chaos, the young have to fight to survive, while the rescue teams struggle against time to save them. Even a TV helicopter is employed in the rescue. Although most of the children are rescued, the emotional effects of the uncertainty and deaths on the survivors, rescuers and families is a key part of the character development of the film.  The film ends at a memorial service held at the site of the incident.

Cast
 Joe Spano as Dr. Richard Koons
 David Lascher as Brad Jamison
 Michael A. Goorjian as Scott Chapman
 Amy Van Nostrand as Linda Smith
 Norm Skaggs as Jerry Smith
 Renee O'Connor as Leslie
 Scott Michael Campbell as Mike Smith
 Blayne Weaver as Jeff Bowman
 Lisa Rieffel as Leanne Pond
 David Franklin as Dave Villareal

References

External links
 

1993 films
1993 television films
American television films
The Wolper Organization films
Films directed by Chris Thomson (director)
1990s English-language films